Admete (minor planet designation: 398 Admete), provisional designation 1894 BN, is a dark, carbonaceous asteroid from the outer region of the asteroid belt, about 47 kilometers in diameter. It was discovered on 28 December 1894, by French astronomer Auguste Charlois at Nice Observatory in southeastern France. 
 
The dark C-type asteroid orbits the Sun at a distance of 2.1–3.4 AU once every 4 years and 6 months (1,656 days). Its orbit shows an eccentricity of 0.22 and is tilted by 10 degrees to the plane of the ecliptic. The body's surface has a low albedo of 0.06, which is a typical value for carbonaceous asteroids.

It had been titled the lowest numbered asteroid with no previously known period until its opposition in 2014, when a photometric light-curve analysis was performed at the Uruguayan Los Algarrobos Observatory (OLASU, I38). Still in 2014, Eduardo Alvarez at OLASU went on to determine the period of the next lowest numbered asteroid with no previously known period, 457 Alleghenia. Since then all asteroids numbered up to 500 had their rotation period determined. As of 2014, there are still 22 asteroids with no known period up to number 1000.

The minor planet was named from Greek mythology for Admete, daughter of king Eurystheus, who appointed the Twelve Labors of Heracles, after whom the minor planet 5143 Heracles is named. One of the labors was to obtaining the golden girdle of Hippolyta, because Admete coveted it.

References

External links 
 Observatorio Los Algarrobos, Salto, Uruguay, website
 Asteroid Lightcurve Database (LCDB), query form (info )
 Dictionary of Minor Planet Names, Google books
 Asteroids and comets rotation curves, CdR – Observatoire de Genève, Raoul Behrend
 Discovery Circumstances: Numbered Minor Planets (1)-(5000) – Minor Planet Center
 
 

Background asteroids
Admete
Admete
C-type asteroids (SMASS)
18941228